Harold Kaplan (10 September 1895 – 1 April 1973) was a Canadian architect.

Biography
Born 10 September 1895, in Bucharest, Romania, he moved to London at the age of three with his widowed mother, Tillie Hohan. In 1902, they moved to Toronto, and then his mother married Frank Kaplan. During his teenage years, he stayed for a while in Philadelphia with one of his relatives. After returning to Toronto, Kaplan went to Toronto Technical School where he studied architecture and building construction. He married Dorothy Spain in 1923. In 1919–20, he worked at Page & Warrington. In 1922, he founded Kaplan & Sprachman with Abraham Sprachman, which is mostly recognized for designing many movie theaters across Canada from the 1920s to the 1950s, and also for designing synagogues and buildings for the Jewish communities.

His work was part of the architecture event in the art competition at the 1948 Summer Olympics. The Primrose Club commissioned Kaplan & Sprachman for its new building in Toronto in 1959.  The firm designed the historic  Anshei Minsk Synagogue, the Shaarei Shomayim synagogue, both in Toronto, Beth Israel Synagogue in Edmonton, Beth Israel in Vancouver, Baycrest Centre for Geriatric Care, the new Mount Sinai Hospital, Oakdale Golf and Country Club and numerous other synagogues and institutions throughout the country. 

Kaplan & Sprachman designed the Eglinton Theatre in Toronto and the Vogue Theatre in Vancouver which were both designated National Historic Sites by the Historic Sites and Monuments Board of Canada. Overall, they designed more than 70 theaters which were built across Canada between the late 1920s and the early 1950s.

References

External links
 Harold Solomon Kaplan: Biographical Dictionary of architects in Canada

1895 births
1973 deaths
20th-century Canadian architects
Olympic competitors in art competitions
Romanian emigrants to Canada
People from Bucharest
20th-century Jews